Oregon Route 350 is an Oregon state highway running from Joseph to  Imnaha. OR 350 is known as the Little Sheep Creek Highway No. 350 (see Oregon highways and routes).

OR 350 was established in 2003 as part of Oregon's project to assign route numbers to highways that previously were not assigned, and, as of July 2022, ODOT is posting route shields.

Route description 

OR 350 begins at an intersection with OR 82 and OR 351 in Joseph and heads east and northeast to Imnaha, where it ends at the intersection of Upper Imnaha Road and Grizzly Ridge Road.

History 

OR 350 was assigned to the Little Sheep Creek Highway in 2003.

Major intersections

References 
 Oregon Department of Transportation, Descriptions of US and Oregon Routes, https://web.archive.org/web/20051102084300/http://www.oregon.gov/ODOT/HWY/TRAFFIC/TEOS_Publications/PDF/Descriptions_of_US_and_Oregon_Routes.pdf, page 30.
 Oregon Department of Transportation, Little Sheep Creek Highway No. 350, ftp://ftp.odot.state.or.us/tdb/trandata/maps/slchart_pdfs_1980_to_2002/Hwy350_1996.pdf

350
Transportation in Wallowa County, Oregon
Joseph, Oregon